Carlo Ambrosini (born 15 April 1954) is an Italian comic book artist and writer.

Born in Azzano Mella, near Brescia (Lombardy), he began to draw comics in 1976 for Dardo publisher with some war stories. Later he collaborated with Editoriale Corno, Ediperiodici and Mondadori.

In 1980 he began his collaboration with Sergio Bonelli Editore, Italy's largest comics publisher, with some episodes of Ken Parker written by Giancarlo Berardi. In 1987 Ambrosini's art appeared on Dylan Dog, for which he also wrote a story in 1994.

In 1997, also for Bonelli, he launched the new series Napoleone, entirely produced by him. The series was stopped with #54 in 2006.

References

1954 births
Living people
Artists from the Province of Brescia
Italian comics artists
Italian comics writers